Matthew Butson is a Paralympic medalist from New Zealand who competed in alpine skiing.  He competed in the 1998 Winter Paralympics where he won three gold medals in Giant Slalom, Slalom and Super G, and a silver in Downhill.

References

External links 
 
 

Alpine skiers at the 1998 Winter Paralympics
Paralympic silver medalists for New Zealand
Paralympic gold medalists for New Zealand
Living people
New Zealand male alpine skiers
Year of birth missing (living people)
Medalists at the 1998 Winter Paralympics
Paralympic medalists in alpine skiing
Paralympic alpine skiers of New Zealand